The 2013 AMA National Speedway Championship Series was staged over three rounds, which were held at Ventura (June 19), Victorville (September 22) and Auburn (September 27). Billy Janniro took the title, his fourth in total, winning two of the rounds in the process.

Event format 
Over the course of 20 heats, each rider raced against every other rider once. The top eight scorers then reached the semi-finals, with first and second in those semi-finals reaching the final. Points were scored for every ride taken, including the semi-finals and final.

Classification

References 

AMA
United States
Speed
Speed